Halawe (minor planet designation: 518 Halawe) is a minor planet orbiting the Sun. It is named after the Middle Eastern confectionery halva.

References

External links
 
 

Background asteroids
Halawe
Halawe
19031020